Naty Botero is the first studio album by Colombian pop-rock singer Naty Botero, released by Sony BMG on August 31, 2006 outside Colombia.

Track listing
Botero co-wrote and co-produced each track on the album.

Charts

2006 albums
Naty Botero albums